"Hold On" is a song by American rapper Lil Tjay, released on September 27, 2019. It is the seventh single from his debut studio album True 2 Myself (2019).

Composition
The song finds Lil Tjay sing-rapping about his rise to fame, and telling his loved ones to "hold on" and wait for his success ("I think it's time to shine, I've been waiting so long / Broski serving time, he been gone for so long / And I promise I'ma do this sh*t for us, just hold on").

Charts

Certifications

References

2019 singles
2019 songs
Lil Tjay songs
Columbia Records singles
Songs written by Lil Tjay